The 1970 Cal Poly Pomona Broncos football team represented California State Polytechnic College, Kellogg-Voorhis—now known as California State Polytechnic University, Pomona—as a member of the California Collegiate Athletic Association (CCAA) during the 1970 NCAA College Division football season. Led by second-year head coach Roy Anderson, Cal Poly Pomona compiled an overall record of 5–5 with a mark of 1–3 in conference play, placing fourth in the CCAA. The team was outscored by its opponents 245 to 162 for the season. The Broncos played home games at Kellogg Field in Pomona, California.

Schedule

References

Cal Poly Pomona
Cal Poly Pomona Broncos football seasons
Cal Poly Pomona Broncos football